Idiops is a genus of armored trapdoor spiders that was first described by Josef Anton Maximilian Perty in 1833. It is the type genus of the spurred trapdoor spiders, Idiopidae. Idiops is also the most species-rich genus of the family, and is found at widely separated locations in the Neotropics, Afrotropics, Indomalaya and the Middle East. Females live in tubular burrows lined with a thick layer of white silk. These typically have a D-shaped lid that fits into the entrance like a cork, and some burrows have two entrances. The lid may consist of mud, moss or lichen, which is bound below by a thick layer of silk. As in all genera of this family, the anterior lateral eyes (ALE) are situated near the clypeal margin, far in front of the remaining six eyes, which are arranged in a tight group. The males which are smaller in size, wander about or occasionally live in burrows. Like other mygalomorphs, they are relatively large and long-lived. Forest clearance and agricultural practices that loosen the soil and enhance erosion, besides soil removal for brick making have been pointed out as serious threats to some Indian species. Species ranges are poorly known – in India for instance, most species are known only from their type localities.

Species
 it contains 96 species found in South America, Africa, South Asia and the Middle East:

 I. angusticeps (Pocock, 1900) — West Africa
 I. argus Simon, 1889 — Venezuela
 I. arnoldi Hewitt, 1914 — South Africa
 I. aussereri Simon, 1876 — Congo
 I. bombayensis Siliwal, Molur & Biswas, 2005 — India
 I. bonapartei Hasselt, 1888 — Suriname
 I. bonny Siliwal, Hippargi, Yadav & Kumar, 2020 — India
 I. cambridgei Ausserer, 1875 — Colombia
 I. camelus (Mello-Leitão, 1937) — Brazil
 I. carajas Fonseca-Ferreira, Zampaulo & Guadanucci, 2017 — Brazil
 I. castaneus Hewitt, 1913 — South Africa
 I. clarus (Mello-Leitão, 1946) — Argentina, Uruguay
 I. crassus Simon, 1884 — Myanmar
 I. crudeni (Hewitt, 1914) — South Africa
 I. curvicalcar Roewer, 1953 — Congo
 I. curvipes (Thorell, 1899) — Cameroon
 I. damarensis Hewitt, 1934 — Namibia
 I. designatus O. Pickard-Cambridge, 1885 — India
 I. duocordibus (Fonseca-Ferreira, Guadanucci & Brescovit, 2021) — Brazil
 I. fageli Roewer, 1953 — Congo
 I. flaveolus (Pocock, 1901) — South Africa
 I. fossor (Pocock, 1900) — India
 I. fryi (Purcell, 1903) — South Africa
 I. fuscus Perty, 1833 (type) — Brazil
 I. gerhardti Hewitt, 1913 — South Africa
 I. germaini Simon, 1892 — Brazil
 I. gracilipes (Hewitt, 1919) — South Africa
 I. grandis (Hewitt, 1915) — South Africa
 I. gunningi Hewitt, 1913 — South Africa
 I. g. elongatus Hewitt, 1915 — South Africa
 I. guri (Fonseca-Ferreira, Guadanucci & Brescovit, 2021) — Brazil
 I. hamiltoni (Pocock, 1902) — South Africa
 I. harti (Pocock, 1893) — St. Vincent
 I. hepburni (Hewitt, 1919) — South Africa, Lesotho
 I. hirsutipedis Mello-Leitão, 1941 — Argentina
 I. hirsutus (Hewitt, 1919) — South Africa
 I. joida Gupta, Das & Siliwal, 2013 — India
 I. kaasensis Mirza, Vaze & Sanap, 2012 — India
 I. kanonganus Roewer, 1953 — Congo
 I. kaperonis Roewer, 1953 — Congo
 I. kazibius Roewer, 1953 — Congo
 I. kentanicus (Purcell, 1903) — South Africa
 I. lacustris (Pocock, 1897) — Tanzania
 I. lusingius Roewer, 1953 — Congo
 I. madrasensis (Tikader, 1977) — India
 I. mafae Lawrence, 1927 — Namibia
 I. meadei O. Pickard-Cambridge, 1870 — Uganda
 I. medini Pratihar & Das, 2020 — India
 I. mettupalayam Ganeshkumar & Siliwal, 2013 — India
 I. microps (Hewitt, 1913) — South Africa
 I. minguito Ferretti, 2017 — Argentina
 I. mocambo (Fonseca-Ferreira, Guadanucci & Brescovit, 2021) — Brazil
 I. monticola (Hewitt, 1916) — South Africa
 I. monticoloides (Hewitt, 1919) — South Africa
 I. mossambicus (Hewitt, 1919) — Mozambique
 I. munois Roewer, 1953 — Congo
 I. neglectus L. Koch, 1875 — Unknown
 I. nigropilosus (Hewitt, 1919) — South Africa
 I. nilagiri Das & Diksha, 2019 — India
 I. nilopolensis (Mello-Leitão, 1923) — Brazil
 I. ochreolus (Pocock, 1902) — South Africa
 I. opifex (Simon, 1889) — French Guiana
 I. oriya Siliwal, 2013 — India
 I. palapyi Tucker, 1917 — Botswana
 I. pallidipes Purcell, 1908 — Namibia
 I. parvus Hewitt, 1915 — South Africa
 I. petiti (Guérin, 1838) — Brazil
 I. piluso Ferretti, Nime & Mattoni, 2017 — Argentina
 I. pirassununguensis Fukami & Lucas, 2005 — Brazil
 I. prescotti Schenkel, 1937 — Tanzania
 I. pretoriae (Pocock, 1898) — South Africa
 I. pulcher Hewitt, 1914 — South Africa
 I. pulloides Hewitt, 1919 — South Africa
 I. pullus Tucker, 1917 — South Africa
 I. pungwensis Purcell, 1904 — South Africa
 I. pylorus Schwendinger, 1991 — Thailand
 I. rastratus (O. Pickard-Cambridge, 1889) — Brazil
 I. reshma Siliwal, Hippargi, Yadav & Kumar, 2020 — India
 I. robustus (Pocock, 1898) — East Africa
 I. rohdei Karsch, 1886 — Paraguay
 I. royi Roewer, 1961 — Senegal
 I. rubrolimbatus Mirza & Sanap, 2012 — India
 I. sally Siliwal, Hippargi, Yadav & Kumar, 2020 — India
 I. santaremius (F. O. Pickard-Cambridge, 1896) — Brazil
 I. schenkeli Lessert, 1938 — Congo
 I. siolii (Bücherl, 1953) — Brazil
 I. straeleni Roewer, 1953 — Congo
 I. striatipes Purcell, 1908 — Botswana
 I. sylvestris (Hewitt, 1925) — South Africa
 I. syriacus O. Pickard-Cambridge, 1870 — Syria, Israel
 I. thorelli O. Pickard-Cambridge, 1870 — South Africa
 I. tolengo Ferretti, 2017 — Argentina
 I. upembensis Roewer, 1953 — Congo
 I. vandami (Hewitt, 1925) — South Africa
 I. vankhede Siliwal, Hippargi, Yadav & Kumar, 2020 — India
 I. versicolor (Purcell, 1903) — South Africa
 I. wittei Roewer, 1953 — Congo
 I. yemenensis Simon, 1890 — Yemen

See also

 List of Idiopidae species

References

Idiopidae
Mygalomorphae genera
Spiders of Africa
Spiders of Asia
Spiders of South America
Taxa named by Maximilian Perty